Pritom Hasan (born January 27, 1993) is a Bangladeshi actor, model, music director, and singer. He is known for producing, singing, and directing songs, as well as starring in music videos. He also has featured in films and shows. He has worked in the soundtrack department for several films, such as Debi, Mission Extreme, and Operation Sundarbans.

Biography

Early life and education 
Pritom was born on January 27, 1993, in Dhaka, Bangladesh, the younger of 2 children of Khalid Hassan Milu (d. 2005) and Fatema Hasan Polash. His father was a famous singer in Bangladesh who died from liver cirrhosis when Pritom was just 12 years old. He spend a part of his childhood in a village called Tongi. Pritom studied higher secondary at Gulshan Commerce College. Before that, he attended a school called  Safiuddin Sarker Academy in Tongi. He graduated from Southeast University (Bangladesh) majoring in English.

Career 
He was inspired by his brother and started a musical career in his early 20s. His first composed song was titled Cheleti Abol Tabol Meyeti Pagol Pagol, which was released in 2015. Later on, he started singing and several of his songs gained popularity among youths.

Hasan began his acting career by starring in a short film titled Habib Wahid: Jhor. His first breakthrough performance was in Nuhash Humayun's 700 Taka, which garnered popularity. Since then he has acted in numerous music videos, short films, feature films, web content, and shows. Some of them include Khoka (short horror), Kache Ashar Oshomapto Golpo (TV), Wedding Bells (TV Miniseries), Bichhuz (TV Miniseries), YouTumor (2021 film), Pett Kata Shaw (TV Miniseries), among others.

Personal life 
On October 28, 2022, Pritom married Shahtaj Monira Hashem, a Bangladeshi model, actress, singer and a talk show host after dating for five years. The wedding was held in a 5-star hotel in Srimangal, Sylhet, and was attended by several prominent figures such as filmmaker Nuhash Humayun and Habib Wahid.

Pritom grew up in a Muslim household and identifies himself as a Sunni Muslim.

Selected works

Filmography

TV films 
{| class="wikitable"
|+
!Year
!Title
!Role
!Platform
!Note
|-
|2018
|Pizza Bhai
|
|Bioscope
|
|-
|2019
|700 Taka
|
|
|
|-
|2021
|WTFry
|
|Zee5
|
|-
|2021
|YouTumor
|
|Chorki
||-
|2022
|Araal
|
|Chorki
|
|}

 TV series 
 Wedding Bell (2019)
 Pett Kata Shaw (2022)

 Music video 
 Jadukor (2018)
 Girlfriend er Biya (2018) Khoka (2018)
 Morey Jak (2021) Shoroter Shesh Theke Bhenge Porona Ebhabe''

Discography

Albums

References

External links 
 

1993 births
Living people
People from Dhaka
Bangladeshi male singers
Bangladeshi composers
Bangladeshi film actors